Winmill is a surname. Notable people with the surname include:

B. Lynn Winmill (born 1952), American judge
Charles Winmill (1865–1945), English architect
Sammie Winmill (born 1948), British actress 
Stanley Winmill (1889–1940), Welsh rugby player

English-language surnames